Umar Makram bin Hussien al-Sayouti (1750-1822) was an Egyptian political leader at the time of the 1798 French invasion and in the subsequent political disorders.

Biography

Makram was born in 1750 in Asyut. He was educated at Al-Azhar University, and became a leader of the nobles of Egypt and an Egyptian national figure. He was prominent in leading Egyptian resistance to the 1798 invasion of Egypt by France (led by Napoleon).

After the French withdrew from Egypt in 1801, a power struggle ensued between the Mamluks, Britain and the Ottoman Empire, and Egypt was nominally restored to the Ottoman Empire.
Makram allied with Muhammed Ali, the commander of the Albanian troops within the army sent by the Empire to restore order.

In May 1805, Egyptians led by Makram forced the Ottoman Sultan at the time, Selim III to replace the Wali Ahmed Khurshid Pasha with Muhammed Ali. Britain disagreed with this decision and attempted to invade Egypt in the Alexandria expedition of 1807.

Makram soon discovered that Muhammed Ali planned to rule Egypt by himself, Makram objected to a foreign ruler. Muhammed Ali exiled Makram to Damietta on 9 August 1809, where he stayed for four years. Makram then moved to Tanta, where he died in 1822.

Legacy
A mosque named for him and designed by Mario Rossi stands in Tahrir Square in Cairo. An exhibition on his life was recently  celebrated at the Louvre in Paris, France.

External links
 Omar Makram

People from Asyut
18th-century Egyptian people
Al-Azhar University alumni
1750 births
1822 deaths
People from Asyut Governorate
Egyptian revolutionaries
Egyptian nationalists
African revolutionaries